Rosebank railway station is a Metrorail station on the Southern Line in Rosebank, a suburb of Cape Town. It is located between Main Road and Liesbeek Parkway; on the west side it is accessible from Ryan Road and Hope Road, while on the east side it is accessible from Lower Nursery Road.

Rosebank is the closest railway station to the main campus of the University of Cape Town, being located only  from the university's Jammie Shuttle bus stop at Tugwell Hall residence.

The station was renovated in 2015.

The station has two high-level side platforms, connected by a pedestrian subway under the tracks. In normal operation, Platform 1 (the western platform) is used for trains travelling towards Cape Town, while Platform 2 (the eastern platform) is used for trains travelling towards Simon's Town.

Notable places nearby
 University of Cape Town main campus
 Baxter Theatre Centre
 Council for Scientific and Industrial Research Cape Town office
 South African Bureau of Standards Cape Town office

Railway stations in Cape Town
Metrorail Western Cape stations